Frank Milburn may refer to:

 Frank W. Milburn (1892–1962), American general    
 Frank Pierce Milburn (1868–1926), American architect